The Bionic Vet is a BBC documentary television series following the work of veterinarian Noel Fitzpatrick at his veterinary practice in Surrey. Fitzpatrick and his team of over 100 vets, nurses and support staff find new methods and techniques to help pets within more unique problems that would often leave euthanasia as the only option.

Many pets are brought to the practice from all over the country. Oscar the Cat, flown over from Jersey, was featured in the first episode.

Episodes

References

External links

 Fitzpatrick Referrals

Episode list using the default LineColor
2010 British television series debuts
2010 British television series endings
2010s British documentary television series
BBC television documentaries
British reality television series
English-language television shows
Veterinary medicine in the United Kingdom